Beatrice the Sixteenth: Being the Personal Narrative of Mary Hatherley, M.B., Explorer and Geographer is a 1909 feminist utopian novel by the English lawyer, writer and activist Irene Clyde—who is remembered as non-binary, transgender, or as a trans woman—about a time traveller who discovers a lost world, which contains a postgender society.

Plot summary 
The protagonist Mary Hatherley, M.B., an explorer and geographer, travels through the desert somewhere in Asia Minor. A kick from a camel sends her into another plane of existence, which seems to exist in a time before Christ.

Mary is rescued by a group of fair, clean-shaven people wearing robes and escorted back to their kingdom, known as Armeria. It is a slave-owning monarchy ruled over by Queen Beatrice the Sixteenth. The Armerians live in luxurious palaces and fight with darts, javelins and swords; despite their fighting abilities, the natives are familiar with both agriculture and government.

There are two classes of people, free and slave; slaves can apply to change households if they wish. They follow a strict vegetarian diet, having ceased to slaughter animals for over a thousand years. Life partnerships are known as a "conjux" and divorce is unknown; relationships appear to be based on love and companionship, rather than sex. The Armerians are unable to reproduce, so infants are purchased from a neighbouring tribe.

The Armerian language is a combination of Latin and Greek, which Mary is familiar with and contains no gendered nouns. Mary is soon able to understand and communicate with them and is drawn to Ilex, one of the leading figures in the kingdom.

Mary uncovers a plot to dethrone Queen Beatrice in favor of the queen of Uras, a neighbouring kingdom. This results in the dismissal of the perpetrators and a war with the kingdom of Uras, in which Mary aids the people of Armerias and they eventually win.

After the war, Mary is offered a way to return home by the court astrologer, but decides to remain and form a conjux with Ilex. Mary uses the astrologer's help to send a manuscript to a friend in Scotland in our world, who arranges for it to be published by Irene Clyde.

Themes

Defamiliarization 
Beatrice the Sixteenth has been described as a successful example of defamiliarization, in that it places the reader in a world initially without any indications of gender and this places strain on the reader's attempt to apply existing social paradigms which require gender categorisation.

Gender and sexuality 
The novel has been cited as a predecessor of other feminist utopias and modern radical feminist thinking on gender and sexuality. Some commentators draw attention to how the novel initially avoids the use of gendered pronouns, instead referring to characters as a "figure", "person" or "personage", yet as the novel progresses, gendered pronouns such as "she" are increasingly used and feminine characteristics are blatantly valued. Others, such as Sonja Tiernan, argue that despite Armeria being presented as genderless, the characters all appear to be female. Emily Hamer calls the book a lesbian love story. The author's deliberate avoidance of gendering the book's characters has been contrasted to Ursula K. Leguin's 1969 novel The Left Hand of Darkness, which uses masculine pronouns to refer to its genderless characters. It has also been compared to Charlotte Perkins Gilman's Herland, published six years later, in 1915, with Beatrice the Sixteenth described as being "more radical". The book is considered to be an early example of transgender literature.

Marriage 
Sonja Tiernan argues that the book is critical of heterosexual marriage and presents it as only being redeemable when it's based on a relationship between people of the same gender.

Reception 
The novel sold badly and copies were still held by the publisher in the 1950s. It was described as "well written, interesting and its characters are more than mere puppets" by one contemporary reviewer. Another argued that the "Adventures of Mary Hatherley" would have been a better title, but praised the vegetarianism of the Armerians. A review in the Herald of the Cross interpreted the book as having a spiritual and occult message, stating that the author "means it to represent the Soul's experience upon an occult plane of consciousness".  Louise Radford Wells described the novel as a "quite unusual story" and was initially confused by the sex of the characters, until realising that "every heroine is also a hero"; she ended her review stating that the book "is very well written and proves entertaining". A review in The Guardian speculated whether the author was an avid suffragist. It also described the society in the book as a delightful place, but felt that the book lacked additional details about the society's workings. Overall, it called the style of the book incoherent, but felt that it presented interesting ideas.

Criticism 
One contemporary reviewer described the conditions of the book's setting "as very singular, and not easily comprehensible, consequently the story somewhat lacks what may be called human interest."

Melanie Taylor in Changing Subjects, describes the novel as "a highly implausible tale", with a "rather turgid prose style", which presents an idealised vision of "what is ultimately an all-female world", arguing that it fails to represent a real utopia:

Far from being the ideal state it sets out to be, this world is riddled with its own divisions and conflicts. Hierarchical and binary distinctions are the foundational poles of this alternative existence—Armeria/Uras, free people/slaves, civilised/barbarians—whilst in its practices of "conjux" (which means "a joined person") the Western conventions of monogamy and marriage are upheld.

Editions 
A new edition of the book is expected be published in 2023 by Mint Editions.

References

Further reading

External links 
 Clyde, Irene at The Encyclopedia of Science Fiction

1900s LGBT novels
1909 British novels
1909 debut works
1909 science fiction novels
Androgyny in fiction
Asexuality in fiction
British LGBT novels
British romance novels
British science fiction novels
Feminist science fiction novels
George Bell & Sons books
LGBT speculative fiction novels
Lost world novels
Macmillan Publishers books
Monarchy in fiction
Novels about time travel
Novels with lesbian themes
Novels with transgender themes
Utopian novels
Vegetarianism in fiction